Ceylon. An Account of the Island, Physical, Historical, and Topographical with Notices of its Natural History, Antiquities and Productions is a two-volume book from 1859 by James Emerson Tennent.

"There is no island in the world, Great Britain itself not excepted, that has attracted the attention of authors in so many distant ages and so many different countries as Ceylon. There is no nation in ancient or modern times possessed of a language and a literature, the writers of which have not at some time made it their theme. Its aspect, its religion, its antiquities, and productions, have been described as well by the classic Greeks, as by those of the Lower Empire; by the Romans; by the writers of China, Burmah, India, and Kashmir; by the geographers of Arabia and Persia; by the medieval voyagers of Italy and France; by the annalists of Portugal and Spain; by the merchant adventurers of Holland, and by the travellers and topographers of Great Britain."- Introduction

First published in 1859, by Spottiswoode & Co. for Longman, Green, Longman, and Roberts of London Ceylon proved very popular and five editions, variously revised were in published in eight months, the last in 1860.
The work is an account of many aspects of the island of Ceylon with  chapters on the geology, climate, flora and fauna, history, religion and Buddhism, farming, commerce, the arts, science, Portuguese, Dutch and English influence followed  by accounts of elephants, the forest, and ruined cities.

"Ceylon" is an encyclopaedic work collating the research of many people. In the Introduction to "Ceylon" Tennent writes "Respecting the Physical Geography and Natural History of the colony, I found an equal want of reliable information; and every work that even touched on the subject was pervaded by the misapprehension which I have collected evidence to correct; that Ceylon is but a fragment of the great Indian continent dissevered by some local convulsion; and that the zoology and botany of the island are identical with those of the mainland. Thus for almost every particular and fact, whether physical or historical, I have been to a great extent thrown on my own researches; and obliged to seek for information in original sources, and in French and English versions of Oriental authorities. The results of my investigations are embodied in the following pages; and it only remains for me to express, in terms however inadequate, my obligations to the literary and scientific friends by whose aid I have been enabled to pursue my inquiries". Collaborators resident in Ceylon include, especially the Belfast born naturalist Robert Templeton and like Tennent a  fellow Member of the Belfast Natural History Society who is thanked thus for his cordial assistance in numerous departments; but above all in relation to the physical geography and natural history of the island. Here his scientific knowledge, successfully cultivated during a residence of nearly twelve years in Ceylon, and his intimate familiarity with its zoology and productions, rendered his co-operation invaluable. Others were  Dr. Cameron, of the Army Medical Staff (as was Templeton), Dr. Davy "when connected with the medical staff of the army from 1816 to 1820", William Ferguson, Esq., employed by the Survey Department of the Civil Service in Ceylon and a botanist, George Gardner and  George Henry Kendrick Thwaites of  the Botanic Gardens in Peradeniya, Edward Frederick Kelaart  Edgar Leopold Layard as well as from officers of the Ceylon Civil Service; the Hon. Gerald  C. Talbot, Mr. C.E. Buller, Mr. Mercer, Mr. Morris, Mr. Whiting, Major Skinner, and Mr. Mitford and  Members of the  Ceylon branch of the Royal Asiatic Society.
Outside Ceylon Tennent thanks Roderick Murchison  "without committing himself as to the controversial portions of the chapter on the Geology and Mineralogy of Ceylon) has done me the favour to offer some valuable suggestions, and to express his opinion as to the general accuracy of the whole", Joseph Dalton Hooker "And I have been permitted to submit the portion of my work which refers to this subject to the revision of the highest living authority on Indian botany",  Thomas Henry Huxley,  Frederic Moore of the East India House Museum, Robert Patterson also from Belfast and author of an Introduction to Zoology  Adam White British Museum, John Edward Gray British Museum, Edward Blyth for the zealous and untiring energy with which he has devoted his attention and leisure to the identification of the various interesting species forwarded from Ceylon, and to their description in the Calcutta Journal.   Michael Faraday "for some notes on the nature and qualities of the "Serpent Stone", Robert FitzRoy "for his most ingenious theory in elucidation of the phenomena of the Tides around Ceylon".
In the historical sections Tennent remarks on contributions made by Julius von Mohl the literary executor of  Eugène Burnouf, George Turnour "for access to his unpublished manuscripts; and to those portions of his correspondence with  James Prinsep which relate to the researches of these two distinguished scholars regarding the Pali annals of Ceylon", Ernest de Saram Wijeyesekerev Karoonaratne, "the Maha-Moodliar and First Interpreter to the Governor", James De Alwis "translator of the Sidath Sangara", the Rev. Mr. Gogerly  "of the Wesleyan Mission, " Rev. R. Spence Hardy "archæology of Buddhism" Mr. Cooley "author of the History of Maritime and Inland Discovery", Mr. Wylie of Shanghae, Mr. Lockhart of Shanghae and Stanislas Julien.

VOLUME 1
PART I.PHYSICAL GEOGRAPHY.
CHAPTER 1 Geology—Mineralogy—Gems
CHAPTER 2 Climate—Health and Disease
CHAPTER 3 Vegetation—Trees and plants 

PART II ZOOLOGY.
CHAPTER I Mammalia 
CHAPTER 2 Birds
CHAPTER 3 Reptiles
CHAPTER 4 Fishes
CHAPTER 5 Mollusca, Radiata and Acephalae
CHAPTER 6 Insects
CHAPTER 7 Arachnidae, Myriopoda, Crustacea, etc.
PART III THE SINGHALESE CHRONICLES.
CHAPTER 1 Sources of Singhalese history – the Mahawanso
CHAPTER 2 The Aborigines
CHAPTER 3 Conquest of Wijayo, B.C. 543. – Establishment of Buddhism  B.C. 307.
CHAPTER 4 The  Buddhist  Monuments.

CHAPTER 5 Singhalese Chivalry  - Elala and Dutugaimunu 
CHAPTER 6 The  Influences of  Buddhism on Civilisation 
CHAPTER 7 Fate of the Aborigines (Naga people and Yaksha people)
CHAPTER 8 Extinction of the Great Dynasty (Vijaya B.C. 505 –MahasenaA.D. 302)
CHAPTER 9 Kings of the  Lower  Dynasty  (Maha-Sen, A.D. 301, to the accession of Prakrama Bahu, A.D. 1153)
CHAPTER 10 Domination of the Malabars 
CHAPTER 11 The  Reign of  Prakrama Baku 
CHAPTER 12 Fate of the Singhalese Monarchy – Arrival of the Portuguese A.D. 1505
PART IV SCIENCES AND SOCIAL ARTS.
CHAPTER 1 Population, caste, slavery and Raja-Kariya
CHAPTER 2 Agriculture, irrigation, cattle and crops
CHAPTER 3 Early commerce, shipping and productions
CHAPTER 4 Manufactures
CHAPTER 5 Working in metals
CHAPTER 6 Engineering

CHAPTER 7 The Fine Arts
CHAPTER 8 Social life 
CHAPTER 9 Sciences
CHAPTER 10 Singhalese literature
PART V MEDIEVAL HISTORY
CHAPTER 1 Ceylon as known to the Greeks and Romans  
CHAPTER 2 Indian, Arabian, and Persian authorities 
CHAPTER 3 Ceylon as known to the Chinese
CHAPTER 4 Ceylon as known to the Moors, Genoese and  Venetians

Volume 2

PART VI MODERN HISTORY. 
CHAPTER 1 The Portuguese in Ceylon
CHAPTER 2 The Dutch in Ceylon 
CHAPTER 3 The English period

PART VII SOUTHERN AND CENTRAL PROVINCES 
CHAPTER 1 Point de Galle 
CHAPTER 2 Galle To Colombo  
CHAPTER 3 Colombo 
CHAPTER 4 The Ceylon  Government, Revenue and Establishments - The country from Colombo to Kandy
CHAPTER 5 Kandy to Paradenia 
CHAPTER 6 Gampola and the Coffee Districts
CHAPTER 7 Pusilawa and Neuera-Ellia
PART VIII THE ELEPHANT 
CHAPTER 1 Structure
CHAPTER 2 Habits
CHAPTER 3 Elephant shooting 
CHAPTER 4 An Elephant corral
CHAPTER 5 The captives
CHAPTER 6 Conduct in captivity

PART IX THE NORTHERN FORESTS. 
CHAPTER 1 Forest travelling  in Ceylon
CHAPTER 2 Bintenne — The  Mahawelli–Ganga - The Ancient Tanks
CHAPTER 3  The Veddhas
CHAPTER 4 Batticaloa — "The Musical Fish " — The Salt Country
CHAPTER 5  Trincomalee — The Ebony Forests — The Salt Formations — The Great Tank of Padivil
CHAPTER 6 The Peninsula of Jaffna - The Palmyra Palm - The Tamils 
CHAPTER 7 Adam's bridge and the islands — The Pearl Fishery
PART X THE RUINED CITIES. 
CHAPTER 1 Sigiri and Pollanarrua 
CHAPTER 2 The Tank of Minery — Anarajapoora and the West Coast

See also
Sri Lankan place name etymology
List of Sri Lankan monarchs
An Historical Relation of the Island Ceylon

External links
Gutenberg Full text
 Scan of volume 1 (The Internet Archive)
 Scan of volume 2 (The Internet Archive)

British Ceylon
1859 books
Spottiswoode books
Books about Sri Lankan natural history
Books about Sri Lankan exploration
History books about Sri Lanka
Books about politics of Sri Lanka